Archie Butler Barnett (March 23, 1891 – June 1986) was an American Negro league catcher in the 1920s.

A native of Pittsburgh, Pennsylvania, Barnett played for the Pittsburgh Keystones in 1921. He died in Pittsburgh in 1986 at age 95.

References

External links
Baseball statistics and player information from Baseball-Reference Black Baseball Stats and Seamheads

1891 births
1986 deaths
Date of death missing
Pittsburgh Keystones players
20th-century African-American sportspeople